Since 2001, ABC Classic has organised a number of Classic 100 Countdown surveys. The results of each survey are decided by votes cast by the listeners of ABC Classic. After the voting, the works are played in reverse order of popularity over an intense period of programming. A feature of the countdown is that the top 100 pieces are kept secret until announced.

The top five in each of the countdowns are as follows:

See also
 Classic FM Hall of Fame, a similar list in the UK

References

Classic 100 Countdowns (ABC)